The 2005 New Zealand Grand Prix was an open wheel racing car race held at Teretonga Park, near Invercargill on 16 January 2005.

It was the fiftieth New Zealand Grand Prix and was open to Formula Ford cars.

Classification

Qualifying

Race

References

External links
 New Zealand Formula Ford

New Zealand Grand Prix
Grand Prix